Mehmood Aslamis a Pakistani television and stage actor. He has appeared in classic drama series such as Andhera Ujala, Payas, Din, Janjaalpura and is commonly known for his role in ongoing comedy series Bulbulay. Some of his projects include Landa Bazar, Daray Daray Naina, Chhalawa, Achanak, Uraan and Ladies Park.

Filmography

Television 
Selected Drama Serials

Telefilms

Anthology series

Other appearances

Accolades

References

External links 
 

1961 births
Living people
Pakistani male film actors
Pakistani male television actors
Pakistani male stage actors
People from Karachi
Punjabi people
ARY Digital people
Male actors in Urdu cinema